Mercury oxide can refer to:

 Mercury(I) oxide (mercurous oxide), Hg2O
 Mercury(II) oxide (mercuric oxide), HgO